"All Over Again" is a song written and originally recorded by Johnny Cash. He recorded it for his first single on Columbia Records.

The single (Columbia 4-41251, with "What Do I Care" on the opposite side) was released between September and November 1958.

"All Over Again" reached #38 on the Billboard Hot 100 and #4 on the Billboard country chart, while "What Do I Care" made it to #52 and #7, respectively.

Background

Charts

References 

Johnny Cash songs
1958 singles
1958 songs
Songs written by Johnny Cash
Sun Records singles